Alfredo "Doca" de Almeida Rêgo (14 May 1905 Sant'Ana do Livramento, Rio Grande do Sul, Brazil – 30 July 1988, Rio de Janeiro, Brazil) was a Brazilian football player. He played for the Brazil national team. He was part of the delegation of the national team at the 1930 World Cup. But he was not included in the squad of 22 players, as was Humberto de Araujo Benevenuto.

His older brother Gilberto de Almeida Rego was referee for 3 matches and linesman for 2 at the 1930 World Cup. Gilberto was also a member of the Comissão Técnica of the Brazil national team in the tournament.

From 1923 to 1935, Doca played for SC Mackenzie, São Cristóvão and Flamengo. In 1926, Doca's club São Cristóvão became the Carioca champion for the only time in its history.

Doca only played one match for Seleção. After the 1930 World Cup, Brazil played a match against the USMNT in Rio. Brazil won 4–3, Doca scored one goal.

Alfredo de Almeida Rego was one of the leaders of the São Cristóvão basketball team. The club was the Carioca champion for two consecutive years, in 1929 and 1930. The team captain was Alfredo's older brother, football referee Gilberto de Almeida Rego. Another brother, Ary de Almeida Rego, also played on the team.

Alfredo de Almeida Rego lived longer than all of these brothers, he died of sepsis on July 30, 1988, in Rio de Janeiro. The incorrect date of Alfredo's death in 1956 is most likely related to another brother, Moacyr de Almeida Rego, who died on July 4, 1956, of myocardial infarction.

Club 
 Campeonato Carioca (1): 
São Cristóvão: 1926

References

1905 births
1988 deaths
Brazilian footballers
Brazil international footballers
1930 FIFA World Cup players
CR Flamengo footballers
Association football forwards